Carl Bergman(n) may refer to:

 Carl Bergmann (musician) (1821–1876), German-American cellist and conductor
 Carl Bergmann (anatomist) (1814–1865), German anatomist
 Carl Bergmann (Secretary of State) (1874–1935), German secretary of state
 Carl Bergman (born 1987), Swedish tennis player
 Carl Johan Bergman (born 1978), Swedish biathlete